Juan Damián López de Haro, O.SS.T. (also Damián Lopez de Haro y Villarda)(September 27, 1581 – August 24, 1648) was a member of the House of Haro, a member of the Order of the Most Holy Trinity and served as Bishop of Puerto Rico (1643–1648). He is known for expressing his disillusionment on Puerto Rico's dilapidated colony status in letters and poems written to Spanish officials.

Early years
López de Haro was born in Toledo, Spain on September 27, 1581, where he was baptized on the same day. He enrolled in Religious studies in 1599, majoring in philosophy at the convent in Toledo.  He later majored in Theology continuing his studies in Salamanca.

Bishop of Puerto Rico
López de Haro was appointed Bishop of Puerto Rico on February 9, 1643, confirmed on June 13, ordained as bishop by García Gil Manrique, Bishop of Barcelona on February 14, 1644, and installed upon his arrival to Puerto Rico on July 13, 1644. Upon his arrival, López de Haro began to express his overall dislike with the conditions of the Colony of Puerto Rico at that time and convened a Synod.

In his final years as Bishop, López de Haro began visiting annexed regions of the diocese in what is now Venezuela.
He found that the churches were extremely poor.  He considered that the church was not getting the proper share of tithes, and directed that they should be paid in the cathedral to avoid abuses.  Gregorio de Castellar y Mantilla, Governor and Captain-General of Cumaná, and Francisco de Santillán y Argote, Governor of Isla Margarita, joined in opposing the decision, which they saw as a violation of the currently accepted property rights, and wanted to continue to collect tithes. 
Don Damian died in Margarita on 20 September 1648 after a ship carrying plague arrived from Puerto Rico. 
Two hundred other people died, according to Santillan's report to the court.

Literature
During his tenure, López de Haro wrote extensively maintaining correspondence with numerous dignitaries.  Of the most notable are King Philip IV, and Juan Diez de la Calle, a clerk of the secretary of New Spain of the Council of the Indies (in Madrid). In his letters to King Philip were descriptions of the state of the diocese on both the Island of Puerto Rico, City of San Juan Bautista, and  annexes.

In his letters to Juan Dias de la Calle, López de Haro is seen expressing his dissatisfaction with colonial conditions of Puerto Rico, and his distaste of white settlers' chivalrous hypocrisy.

López de Haro has also written some of the first recordings of Taíno folk tales and his writings are the only known historical description of Puerto Rico in the mid-seventeenth century.

See also

 Roman Catholic Archdiocese of San Juan de Puerto Rico
 Puerto Rican literature
 List of Latin American writers

References

External links and additional sources
 (for Chronology of Bishops) 
 (for Chronology of Bishops) 

1581 births
1648 deaths
Trinitarian bishops
People from Toledo, Spain
University of Salamanca alumni
17th-century Roman Catholic bishops in Puerto Rico
Spanish Roman Catholic bishops in North America
House of Haro
Roman Catholic bishops of San Juan de Puerto Rico